Maddu is a town in Gomba District in the Central Region of Uganda.

Location
The town is in Maddu sub-county, being one of the seven parishes in that administrative unit. The coordinates of Maddu are 0°12'58.0"N 31°40'02.0"E (Latitude:0.216111; Longitude:31.667222).

Overview
The  Mpigi–Kabulasoke–Maddu–Sembabule Road passes through town.

Economic activities;
Maddu is an agricultural community and Livestock forms the backbone of economic activity in the area.
Milk and meat are important products produced by medium and small scale farmers in the area. In 2008, it was estimated that the sub-county produced more than 50,000 liters of milk daily.[4] The produce is sold locally in the popular Friday cattle markets and also marketed to Kampala, Uganda's capital and largest city about 135 kilometres (80 mi).

Prominent farms and ranches are located in areas of Kilasi (Katende Farm, Bitali family ranch), Kisozi YK Museveni farm and more towards Sembabule on one side, Buyanja and Kyayi on the other side.

The biggest challenges farmers face here are lack of modern model farms and processing plants, dry spells which lower productivity, long quarantines due to livestock diseases which makes sustainability of stock challenging due to increase production costs without income.

See also
 Buganda
 Kabulasoke
 List of cities and towns in Uganda

References

External links
 Maddu Elevation: 

Populated places in Central Region, Uganda
Cities in the Great Rift Valley
Gomba District